Diego Penalva (born January 22, 1976 in Orange) is a French retired professional football player.

Penalva began playing football with local side SC Orange, making an appearance in a 1996–97 Coupe de France match against his future club, FC Martigues. He had a brief stint on the professional level in Ligue 2 with FC Martigues.

References

1976 births
Living people
French footballers
Ligue 2 players
FC Martigues players
US Pontet Grand Avignon 84 players
Association football midfielders